Domagnano is a municipality in San Marino. It has 3,565 inhabitants (May 2018) in an area of 6.62 km2.

Geography
It borders the San Marino municipalities Faetano, Borgo Maggiore, Serravalle and the Italian municipality Coriano.

History
Domagnano, previously known as Montelupo (mountain of wolves) after its coat of arms, was already colonized by Roman times and was first mentioned in c. 1300. It is located on Monte Titano and you can see the Adriatic Sea from here. The so-called Domagnano Treasure was found in the castle here in the late nineteenth century. It is now split between a number of museums, but the largest portions of the treasure are kept at the Germanisches Nationalmuseum in Nuremberg and the British Museum.

Demographic evolution

Parishes
Domagnano has five parishes (curazie):

Cà Giannino, Fiorina, Piandivello, Spaccio Giannoni, Torraccia

References

 
Municipalities of San Marino